Viscount Plumer, of Messines and of Bilton in the County of York, was a title in the Peerage of the United Kingdom. It was created on 3 June 1929 for the soldier and colonial official Field Marshal Herbert Plumer, 1st Baron Plumer. He had already been created Baron Plumer, of Messines and of Bilton in the County of York, on 18 October 1919, also in the Peerage of the United Kingdom. Both titles became extinct after the death of his son and successor, the second Viscount, in 1944.

Viscounts Plumer (1929)
Herbert Onslow Plumer, 1st Viscount Plumer (1857–1932)
Thomas Hall Rokeby Plumer, 2nd Viscount Plumer (1890–1944)

References

Extinct viscountcies in the Peerage of the United Kingdom
Noble titles created in 1929